Ōrere Point is a rural township in the Auckland Region.  It is located on the Hauraki Gulf just outside the Auckland metropolitan area. Facilities include a local store, playground, campground, picnic area, parking and limited mobility toilets. Activities include wild life watching, fishing and swimming.

The name was altered to include a macron in 2019.

Demographics
It is part of the wider Kawakawa Bay-Orere statistical area.

Ōrere Point had a population of 348 at the 2018 New Zealand census, an increase of 63 people (22.1%) since the 2013 census, and an increase of 24 people (7.4%) since the 2006 census. There were 174 households, comprising 183 males and 162 females, giving a sex ratio of 1.13 males per female, with 42 people (12.1%) aged under 15 years, 21 (6.0%) aged 15 to 29, 192 (55.2%) aged 30 to 64, and 96 (27.6%) aged 65 or older.

Ethnicities were 85.3% European/Pākehā, 18.1% Māori, 7.8% Pacific peoples, 2.6% Asian, and 0.9% other ethnicities. People may identify with more than one ethnicity.

Although some people chose not to answer the census's question about religious affiliation, 48.3% had no religion, 31.9% were Christian, 1.7% had Māori religious beliefs and 1.7% had other religions.

Of those at least 15 years old, 48 (15.7%) people had a bachelor's or higher degree, and 84 (27.5%) people had no formal qualifications. 51 people (16.7%) earned over $70,000 compared to 17.2% nationally. The employment status of those at least 15 was that 132 (43.1%) people were employed full-time, 33 (10.8%) were part-time, and 9 (2.9%) were unemployed.

Education

References

External links

Ōrere Point Primary School

Populated places in the Auckland Region
Populated places around the Firth of Thames